Bojan Djordjic ( or Bojan Đorđić; born 6 February 1982) is a Swedish former professional footballer who played as a midfielder.

Starting off his career with IF Brommapojkarna in the late 1990s, he is best remembered for his time with Manchester United, with which he was named the 1999–2000 Jimmy Murphy Young Player of the Year, and AIK, with which he won the 2009 Allsvenskan and 2009 Svenska Cupen. He represented clubs in Sweden, England, Denmark, Serbia, Scotland, Hungary, and Belgium before finishing up his career with Chennaiyin in the Indian Super League in 2015.

A youth international for Sweden between 1998 and 2003, he represented the Sweden U17, U19, and U21 a combined total of 44 times and scored 3 goals.

Club career

Early career and Manchester United 
Born in Belgrade, SFR Yugoslavia, to Serbian professional footballer Ranko Đorđić, Djordjic started his career at IF Brommapojkarna before moving to Manchester United in 1999 as a youth player. Although considered a budding talent, having been awarded the club's Jimmy Murphy Player of the Year Award at the age of 18, he only made two competitive appearances for the club. He also scored with a chip in a 2–0 win against Celtic in Tom Boyd's testimonial at Celtic Park on 15 May 2001, after coming on as a substitute for Ryan Giggs.

He was loaned to Sheffield Wednesday, Aarhus GF and Red Star Belgrade, where he scored his first senior goal against Odense BK in the 2003–04 UEFA Cup.

Rangers 
He signed for Rangers in Scotland in January 2005 on a free transfer. On 9 January 2005 he made his full debut against Celtic in the Scottish Cup. However, injuries limited his chances to establish himself in the first team at Ibrox Stadium.

Plymouth Argyle 
Djordjic moved to Plymouth Argyle on at the end of the 2004–05 season having made four league appearances during Rangers title winning campaign. Other club interested in the winger was Stockholm-based side AIK, the club that Djordjic supports.

On 24 August 2006, after spending just over a season at Plymouth, Djordjic was placed on the transfer list by manager Ian Holloway as a result of his sometimes lax attitude towards the team when playing and training. He was promised the opportunity to get back into the first team once his attitude improved.

Djordjic finally returned to the starting lineup after he scored eight goals in five games for the reserves and after exactly a three-month absence, on 18 November 2006, scoring in the fifth minute in a 1–1 away draw at Southend United. He was removed from the transfer list the following week, and went on to score in the next two consecutive games (Leeds United and Luton Town).

AIK 
On 19 October 2007, Djordjic's contract was terminated by mutual consent due to lack of first-team opportunities. On 13 November, it was officially announced he had signed a two-year deal with Swedish club AIK. His first season for the club has not been what he was hoping for with several injuries and on 13 September 2008 he was injured once again and missed the remaining eight matches of the season. His first match for AIK was against Kalmar FF on 30 March 2008 in the first game of the 2008 season. During the 2009 transfer season, Djordjic was approached by Maccabi Haifa which offering him a contract, however Djordjic rejected saying that he wanted to stay with the club in his heart AIK. Scoring 1 goal and providing 6 assists in all competitions during the 2009 season, he helped AIK win the 2009 Allsvenskan.

Due to the start of the season of 2010, AIK was underperforming as defending champions. This led that club was struggling to avoid relegation. The coach Mikael Stahre left for Panionios GSS and much criticism was aimed at the team's bad performances.

Videoton 
On 28 June media reported that the Hungarian club Videoton had bought both Djordjic and Martin Mutumba. The director of the Hungarian club compared Djordjic with Roberto Baggio and Mutumba was compared with Ronaldinho. The transfer led to many speculations in media, especially since AIK had appointed the Scottish manager Alex Miller only a couple of days before the transfer were made. The players claimed that it was Mr. Millers decision to let the players go, but the organization of AIK claimed that they got such a good offer that they could not refuse to sell. One year later, he terminated his contract that would have expired 2013.

Blackpool 
Djordjic joined Blackpool on a two-year contract in June 2011, reuniting him with manager Holloway. "Ollie (Ian Holloway) is one of the few managers to get the best out of me and I always thought about that," he said. "It's a big step when you're 29 to come back to English football to a club that's just been relegated from the Premier League." His salary was believed to be a minimum of around £160,000 annually, before bonuses. He cancelled his contract with Blackpool by mutual consent on 9 January 2012.

Royal Antwerp 
On 4 February 2012, he signed a short-term contract with the Belgian Second Division club Royal Antwerp.

Return to Sweden 
In June 2012, Djordjic returned to his boyhood club Brommapojkarna. in January 2014, he signed with the Division 1 Norra club Vasalunds IF.

Chennaiyin 
On 21 August 2014, Djordjic was a picked in the inaugural ISL International Draft, signing for Indian Super League side Chennaiyin. Djordjic served as the team captain during his time at the club.

International career 
Djordjic was a part of Sweden's squad at the 1999 UEFA European Under-16 Championship. He played 9 games for the Sweden U21 team, but was often overlooked by the then-manager Torbjörn Nilsson.

Post-playing career
Djordjic is, as of 2021, a pundit on Manchester United's television station, MUTV.

He is currently working as a pundit for Viasat

Honours
Red Star Belgrade
First League of Serbia and Montenegro: 2003–04
Serbia and Montenegro Cup: 2003–04

Rangers

 Scottish Premier League: 2004–05
AIK
Allsvenskan: 2009
Svenska Cupen: 2009
Supercupen: 2010

Videoton
Nemzeti Bajnokság I: 2010–11
Individual
Manchester United Jimmy Murphy Young Player of the Year: 1999–2000

References

External links

Bojan Djordjic at aikfotboll.se 

Bojan Djordjic at HLSZ

 

Living people
1982 births
Footballers from Belgrade
Serbian emigrants to Sweden
Swedish people of Bosnia and Herzegovina descent
Swedish people of Serbian descent
Swedish footballers
Swedish expatriate footballers
Association football midfielders
Aarhus Gymnastikforening players
IF Brommapojkarna players
Manchester United F.C. players
Plymouth Argyle F.C. players
Sheffield Wednesday F.C. players
Rangers F.C. players
Red Star Belgrade footballers
Fehérvár FC players
AIK Fotboll players
Blackpool F.C. players
Royal Antwerp F.C. players
Chennaiyin FC players
Premier League players
English Football League players
Danish Superliga players
Scottish Premier League players
Allsvenskan players
Nemzeti Bajnokság I players
Indian Super League players
Challenger Pro League players
Expatriate footballers in Belgium
Expatriate men's footballers in Denmark
Expatriate footballers in England
Expatriate footballers in Scotland
Expatriate footballers in Serbia and Montenegro
Expatriate footballers in Hungary
Expatriate footballers in India
Swedish expatriate sportspeople in Denmark
Swedish expatriate sportspeople in the United Kingdom
Sweden under-21 international footballers
Swedish expatriate sportspeople in India
Swedish expatriate sportspeople in Hungary
Swedish expatriate sportspeople in Belgium